Timo Fransen (born 3 June 1987) is a Dutch Paralympic cyclist competing in tandem events for the Netherlands, serving as a sighted pilot for blind cyclist Vincent ter Schure.

Ter Schure and Fransen represented the Netherlands at the 2016 Summer Paralympics held in Rio de Janeiro, Brazil and they won one gold medal and two silver medals. They won the gold medal in the men's road race B event and the silver medals in the men's road time trial B and men's individual pursuit B events.

At the 2019 UCI Para-cycling Road World Championships held in Emmen, Netherlands, Fransen and ter Schure won the gold medal in the time trial event. In January 2020, together with Imke Brommer, Larissa Klaassen and ter Schure, he won the team sprint at the UCI Para-cycling Track World Championships and finished third in the pursuit.

References 

1987 births
Living people
People from Westervoort
Cyclists at the 2016 Summer Paralympics
Cyclists at the 2020 Summer Paralympics
Medalists at the 2016 Summer Paralympics
Medalists at the 2020 Summer Paralympics
Paralympic gold medalists for the Netherlands
Paralympic silver medalists for the Netherlands
Paralympic medalists in cycling
Dutch male cyclists
Paralympic cyclists of the Netherlands
Cyclists from Gelderland
21st-century Dutch people